Raabta is a 2017 Indian Hindi-language romantic action thriller film with a dose of comedy directed by Dinesh Vijan in his directorial debut and co-produced by Vijan, Homi Adajania, Bhushan Kumar. It stars actors Sushant Singh Rajput and Kriti Sanon, with Jim Sarbh, Rajkummar Rao and Varun Sharma in supporting roles. The story is based on the concept of reincarnated star-crossed lovers.

The film had faced controversy from producer Allu Aravind of Geetha Arts, who claimed that the film's storyline and characters strongly resembled those of the studio's 2009 film Magadheera. The film released on 9 June 2017.

Plot
Shiv Kakkar is a banker from Amritsar who gets a lucrative opportunity to work in Budapest. He is a fun-loving playboy back home and continues this behaviour in Budapest. Saira Singh is a young woman haunted by mysterious nightmares of drowning to death. She lives by herself in Budapest and works as a chocolatier. Shiv happens to stumble upon Saira's shop while on a date with a woman, but finds himself deeply attracted to Saira. Shocked by the weird connection she feels with Shiv, Saira initially rejects his advances, but eventually succumbs. The next day, Saira reveals that she has never felt such a connection before but is in a mess as she has a boyfriend. Unwilling to let go of their connection, Shiv interrupts Saira's date with her boyfriend Manav and shows her that she would rather be with him than with her boyfriend. Manav breaks up with her, and Shiv and Sairah start spending time together, growing close. One night, they go to a club where Saira tearfully reveals to Shiv that she has a fear of water because her parents drowned after a car accident when she was two years old.

Shiv reveals to Saira that he has to leave for a business trip for a week. They decide to see how they feel after a week's separation. During Shiv's absence, Saira gets to know Zakir and confides in him about her nightmares. During one of their dinners, Zakir drugs Saira and kidnaps her.

Sairah wakes up and finds herself trapped in Zakir's isolated mansion on an island off the coast. She demands him to let her go, but he refuses, saying that he spent his whole life looking for her. He explains that he was madly in love with her in a previous life, but his love remained unrequited. He refuses to let go of her again. When she does not believe him, he shows her a collection of uncannily accurate paintings he made of her at various ages and says she will find the explanation for her nightmares. Thinking he is crazy, she attempts to escape but ends up falling into the ocean, which triggers the memories of her previous life.

Eight hundred years ago, Saira was warrior princess Saiba. She had a childhood best friend, Qaabir (present day Zakir), a fellow warrior from her tribe who was in love with her. Their kingdom was threatened by the Muraakis, led by a wise, old Rajput ruler Muwwaqqil. Qaabir is severely wounded by the fierce warrior Jilaan (present day Shiv), who gives Qaabir an ultimatum to surrender. Saiba challenges Jilaan, and they find themselves attracted to each other. Saiba accepts defeat, surrendering the kingdom to the Muraakis and herself to Jilaan. Qaabir attempts to take Saiba back, but she reveals that she and Jilaan are in love. On their wedding night, a comet falls, and Muwwaqqil realizes that this will be a fateful night. Qaabir ambushes Jilaan and Saiba, and murders Jilaan by wounding him and throws him in the ocean. Saiba jumps into the ocean to save him, but to no avail. Heartbroken on seeing Jilaan die, Saiba decides to drown too. On seeing Saiba dead, Qaabir slits his own throat, killing himself. Muwwaqqil forebodes that these events will repeat.

This time around, when Shiv shows up, Saira decides to fight back against Zakir. When their previous lives' events repeat, Zakir throwing Shiv into the ocean, Shiv drags Zakir down with him, and Zakir dies. Saira jumps into the water and is able to save Shiv. They both swim to shore, only to find the boat on fire and Radha nowhere to be seen. Shiv looks for him in one spot but a little later, he (Radha) is shown holding onto a barrel he didn't explode with Zakir's gun to kill his henchmen.

Cast
 Sushant Singh Rajput as Jilaan, and his reincarnation Shiv Kakkar, who is Saira's boyfriend
 Kriti Sanon as Saiba, who was Jilaan's Wife, and her reincarnation Saira Singh, who is Shiv's Girlfriend
 Jim Sarbh as Kaabir, who was Saiba's Ex-Lover, and his reincarnation Zakir "Zack" Merchant, who is Saira's Fiancé and Crush
 Varun Sharma as Radha Chembare
 Vikas Verma as Manav Mehta
 Karan Singh Chhabra as Happy
 Rajkummar Rao as Muraaqi (guest appearance)
 Deepika Padukone (special appearance in the song "Raabta")

Production 
The film production began in 2015 and it was set to release in 2016. But the film was delayed for a year due to casting issues. In March 2016, a new release date of 9 June 2017 was announced. The film has been majorly shot in Budapest, Hungary and India. Title song Raabta was shot at Tata Castle in Tata, Hungary. The song Sadda Move was shot at Partition Museum, Amritsar. Budget of the film is ₹59.07 Crores (₹590.7 Million). The total number of screen count in India was 1820 and 330 overseas.

Casting
Alia Bhatt was initially considered to play the lead role opposite Sushant Singh Rajput, but turned down the role over scheduling conflicts. In December 2015, Asin was approached to play the lead role opposite Rajput, but she turned down the offer because of her decision to not act post marriage. Kriti Sanon was signed on to play the lead female role in the film in February 2016.

Controversy 
Raabta makers received a legal notice over plagiarism from Magadheera producer Allu Aravind. Raabta producers offered to show Arvind the film. They also offered to deposit an escrow amount with the court, but Arvind reportedly rejected both. A source says it was likely Arvind wanted Magadheera to be remade in Hindi, and was concerned no one would be interested after Raabta. On 8 June 2017, the courts ruled in favor of Raabta makers.

Critical reception
Bollywood Hungama rated it 3.5/5. The Times of India rated it 3.5/5, writing "If sparks flew more organically, it would have been easier to make a connection with this epic tale of love." Koimoi rated it 2/5, writing "Raabta is a confused film that never establishes a firm balance between its crossover love stories." Shubhra Gupta from The Indian Express rated it 1.5/5, writing, "Some questions arise after Raabta has been seen, chief amongst which is one that comes up every time Bollywood tries, and fails, to do a cracking romance. Why is Bollywood incapable of pulling off a full-length film with a pair of lovers connecting, pulling apart, coming together?" India Today rated it 1/5, calling it "A comet-crossed romance which never hits the target."

Critic Rajeev Masand gave the movie one out of five, stating, "This is a movie so singularly pointless, you have to wonder how the writers and the director tricked the financiers into thinking there was a story here worth telling, and why the actors preferred going to shoot every morning instead of sleeping longer hours. This is the kind of film that film critics must endure so you don't have to. Even Denzel Washington couldn't save this film. I’m going with one out of five."

Soundtrack 

The film's music was composed by Pritam, JAM8 and Meet Bros while lyrics are penned by Amitabh Bhattacharya, Irshad Kamil and Kumaar. The first song of the film "Ik Vaari Aa" sung by Arijit Singh was released on 21 April 2017. The second track of the film "Raabta" (Title Track) is a remake from 2012 film Agent Vinods "Raabta (Kehte Hain Khuda)" by Irshad Kamil, and by original makers, Amitabh Bhattacharya and Pritam, sung by Arijit Singh and Nikhita Gandhi and were released on 2 May 2017. The third song, "Sadda Move," sung by Diljit Dosanjh and Pardeep Singh Sran and rapped by Raftaar was released on 9 May 2017. The fourth song, titled "Lambiyaan Si Judaiyaan", sung by Singh, Shadab Faridi and Altamash Faridi, was released on 18 May 2017. The fifth track of the film "Main Tera Boyfriend" is a remake from 2007 album "Punjabi Blockbuster", song "Girl Friend Boy Friend" sung by Gopal Sharma, written by Kumaar and composed by Sohrabuddin and Sourav Roy, was recreated for this film and was released on 22 May 2017. The sixth and the last song titled "Darasal" voiced by Atif Aslam was released on 1 June 2017. Music director Pritam gave his credit to his launched band JAM8 due to creative differences with producers. He cleared that he wants to work as a solo composer by posting a status on Facebook. The soundtrack consisted of 7 songs and was released on 3 June 2017.

Box office 
By the opening weekend, the movie collected Rs. 159.3 million nationwide. The lifetime collection of Raabta was Rs. 256.7 million nationwide. The movie made worldwide gross collection of Rs. 390.5 million.

Accolades

References

External links

T-Series (company) films
2017 films
2010s Hindi-language films
Films involved in plagiarism controversies
Films shot in Hungary
Films set in Croatia
Films set in Asia
Indian romantic action films
Films about reincarnation